"Wait and See" is a song by Christian contemporary-alternative rock musician Brandon Heath from his second studio album, What If We. It was released sometime in early 2009, as the second single from the album.

Background 
This song was produced by Dan Muckala.

Brandon Heath told Kevin Davis of New Release Tuesday that the background for the song is the following:

Composition 
"Wait and See" was written by Brandon Heath, which he said the song comes from Jeremiah 29:11, and the verse is about "For I know the plans I have for you," declares the LORD, "plans to prosper you and not to harm you, plans to give you hope and a future."

Release 
The song "Wait and See" was digitally released as the second single from What If We in early 2009.

Charts

Weekly charts

References 

2009 singles
Brandon Heath songs
Songs written by Brandon Heath
Song recordings produced by Dan Muckala
2008 songs